X-Weighted is a lifestyle documentary series that follows individuals through their attempts to lose weight. It follows a person for six months documenting their exercise, successes, and failures at weight loss. It is commissioned by Slice, produced by Anaid Productions, and distributed by Picture Box Distribution.

X-Weighted has five seasons, three featuring individuals and two featuring families.  There are 65 x 1 hour episodes produced.

X-Weighted Families 
X-Weighted Families is a continuation of X-Weighted. It is similar but each episode features an obese family losing weight together.

Channels that air X-Weighted 
 Sky UK (United Kingdom)
 Turner Latin America (Latin America)
 Foxtel (Australia)
 SBS (Belgium and Netherlands)
 TVNZ (New Zealand)
 Évasion and TVA (Canada)
 TV4 (Sweden)
 TV2 (Hungary)
 TV5 (Finland)

References 

 X-Weighted Website 
Lose 10 kg Weight In 3 Month

External links 
 Official website 
 Anaid Productions 
 Picture Box website 

Canadian reality television series